Cametá Sport Club, commonly referred to as Cametá, is a Brazilian professional club based in Cametá, Pará founded on 22 June 2007.

History
The club was founded on June 22, 2007. They competed in the Série D in 2010, when they were eliminated in the First Stage of the competition. Cametá won the Campeonato Paraense in 2012.

Honours
 Campeonato Paraense
 Winners (1): 2012

 Campeonato Paraense Second Division
 Winners (1): 2022

Stadium
Cametá Sport Club play their home games at Estádio Orfelindo Martins Valente, nicknamed Parque do Bacurau. The stadium has a maximum capacity of 8,320 people.

References

Association football clubs established in 2007
Football clubs in Pará
2007 establishments in Brazil